Teresian may refer to :

Religion 
 the Catholic order of Discalced Carmelites
 the Catholic Teresian Association
 anything else associated with Saint Teresa of Avila

Biology 
 the plant species Teresianus